At least two ships of the Royal Danish Navy have borne the name HDMS Absalon:

  an armoured schooner rated as a cruiser in service from 1862 until 1908.
  an  launched in 2005.

Royal Danish Navy ship names